A. K. M. Nurul Islam (1 August 1919 – 14 November 2015) was a Bangladeshi judge and the 5th Vice President of Bangladesh.

Career
Islam was a judge of East Pakistan High Court from 1967 to 1971. He was the chief election commissioner of Bangladesh Election Commission from 1977 to 1984. From February 1985 until August 1989, he served as the law minister. He was appointed as the vice president of the country on 30 November 1986 by the then President Hussain Muhammad Ershad.

Personal life 
Islam was married to Jahanara Arzu, an Ekushey Padak-winning poet. Together they  had two sons including Justice Md Ashfaqul Islam and a daughter, professor Minara Zahan. 

Islam died on 14 November 2015 in Dhaka. He was buried in Harirampur in Manikganj District.

References

1919 births
2015 deaths
Bangladeshi judges
Vice presidents of Bangladesh
Law, Justice and Parliamentary Affairs ministers of Bangladesh
20th-century Bengalis
21st-century Bengalis